The 1995–96 Estonian Cup was the sixth season of the Estonian main domestic football knockout tournament. Tallinna Sadam won their first title after defeating Jõhvi in the final. Tallinna Sadam qualified for the 1996–97 UEFA Cup Winners' Cup as a result of their victory.

Quarter-finals

|}

Semi-finals

|}

Final

|}

References

External links
 Official website 

Estonian Cup seasons
1995 in Estonian football
1996 in Estonian football
1995–96 in European football